In linguistics, double articulation, duality of patterning, or duality is the fundamental language phenomenon consisting of the use of combinations of a small number of meaningless elements (sounds, that is, phonemes) to produce a large number of meaningful elements (words, actually morphemes). Its name refers to this two-level structure inherent to sign systems, many of which are composed of these two kinds of elements: 1) distinctive but meaningless and 2) significant or meaningful.

Theory
Double articulation refers to the twofold structure of the stream of speech, which can be primarily divided into meaningful signs (like words or morphemes), and then secondarily into distinctive elements (like sounds or phonemes). For example, the meaningful English word "cat" is composed of the sounds /k/, /æ/, and /t/, which are meaningless as separate individual sounds (and which can also be combined to form the separate words "tack" and "act", with distinct meanings). These sounds, called phonemes, represent the secondary and lowest level of articulation in the hierarchy of the organization of speech. Higher, primary, levels of organization (including morphology, syntax, and semantics) govern the combination of these individually meaningless phonemes into meaningful elements.

History
The French concept of double articulation was first introduced by André Martinet in 1949, and elaborated in his Eléments de linguistique générale (1960). The English translation double articulation is a French calque for double articulation (spelled exactly the same in French). It may also be termed duality of patterning.

"Duality of patterning" was proposed by American linguist Charles F. Hockett in a 1958 textbook A course in modern linguistics. The two terms are similar but different, and Hockett and Martinet proposed their concepts independently. Both of them were probably inspired by Danish linguist Louis Hjelmslev's theory of "two planes" of human language. Hjelmslev proposed that human languages have two kinds of planes: planes of plereme ("fullness" in Greek) and planes of ceneme ("emptiness" in Greek). The planes of plereme contain meaningful units, and the planes of ceneme contain meaningless units that make up the meaningful units. For example, the cenemes of spoken language are phonemes, while the pleremes are morphemes or words; the cenemes of alphabetic writing are the letters and the pleremes are the words.

According to Hockett and other linguists, this duality is an important property of human languages, since it allows for the expression of a potentially infinite number of meaningful language sequences. Strictly speaking, however, such expressiveness follows from generativity or productivity (a finite number of components combining via rules to produce a potentially infinite arrangement of novel utterances), not of duality per se (one could have a system with 2 levels of the kind referred to as duality, and yet have only finite productivity). For further discussion, see figurae, as well as Hockett's design features, which treats productivity and duality as distinct essential properties of language.

Sign languages may have less double articulation because more gestures are possible than sound and able to convey more meaning without double articulation.

See also
 Origin of language
 Origin of speech

References

External links
Wendy Sandler et alii, "The gradual emergence of phonological form in a new language", 2009.

Linguistics
Philosophy of language
Semiotics
Theories of language